Maha Nadigan is a 2004 Indian Tamil-language political satire film written and directed by Sakthi Chidambaram starring Sathyaraj, Manoj and P. Vasu.

Plot 
Sathya (Sathyaraj), a junior artiste manages to get an chance to act as a hero in a movie. His popularity increases, as he becomes a superstar. Arivanandham (Vasu), a corrupt politician and the leader of a major political party requests Sathya to contest in the assembly elections, to which Sathya accepts. Arivanandham makes Sathya the Chief Minister candidate. Arivanandham's party receives a brute majority due to Sathya's popularity and wins the assembly elections. Sathya becomes the CM. After becoming the CM, he jails all the ministers including Arivanandham. Sathya orders many raids into the houses of ministers and acts weird. The story then moves to a flashback.

Muthu (Manoj), an diehard fan of Sathya loses his right hand, in a clash between two actors' fans. This leaves a huge impact on Sathya, who learns from this event that how much his fans had been devoted to him. Sathya begins to care for Muthu and the two become close.
Some days before Sathya's oath taking ceremony, Arivanandham is plotting to kill Sathya and become the CM himself. Arivanandham plants bombs in the marriage hall of Muthu's wedding. Fortunately, Sathya escapes the blast but Muthu dies. Sathya desires revenge for Arivanandham and decides to put it in good use, as the flashback ends.

The rest of the film Sathya introduces many reforms in the government. During the end, he dismisses all the corrupt ministers and selects many youngsters as ministers. He resigns and names Devika (Mallika), an IAS officer who has done much service as the Chief Minister and walks away, as the film ends.

Cast

Soundtrack 

Soundtrack was composed by Deva and Released on Lucky Audio.

Reviews 
The Hindu wrote "After "Ennamma Kannu" Shakti Chidambaram made the viewer take notice of his wit and comic sense again in "Charlie Chaplin." [..] In "Maha Nadigan" the humour is back, though he could have concentrated a little more on the storyline too". Indiaglitz wrote "Sakthi Chidambaram deserves kudos for a bold and honest film. But usually bold films are laced with anger, but Mahanadigan is full of poignant humor."

Release 
Made on a shoe-string budget, Maganadigan was a hit.

References

External links 

2004 films
Indian political satire films
Indian parody films
Films scored by Deva (composer)
2000s Tamil-language films
Indian satirical films
Films directed by Sakthi Chidambaram